Emcure Pharmaceuticals Limited is an Indian multinational pharmaceutical company headquartered in Pune. Emcure's product portfolio includes tablets, capsules (both softgel capsules and hard-gel capsules) and injectables. The company is a major producer of HIV antivirals, as well as gynaecology and blood therapeutic drugs.

Operations

Indian plants 
This is the list of manufacturing facilities based in India -
Solid Dosage facility at Hinjwadi - In 2006, Emcure received US FDA approval for its solid dosages facility at Hinjwadi, Pune. The plant manufactures solid oral formulations for the international regulated markets, but is under FDA warning letter
Small volume parenteral facility at Hinjawadi  - US FDA, UK MHRA approved. Has lyophilization and pfs capability, but is under FDA warning letter
Oncology injectable facility at Hinjawadi, but is under FDA warning letter
Solid Orals facilities at Jammu and Bhosari
API facility at Kurkumbh- US FDA approved
Biotech facility at Hinjawadi
R&D center at Gandhinagar and plant at Sanand, Ahmedabad.- Sanand facility is US FDA approved

US plant 
USA - The company has a manufacturing facility and R&D center in East Brunswick, New Jersey, USA.

Investors 
In 2014, Blackstone sold its 13% stake in Emcure to Bain Capital.

AIDS initiative 
Emcure voices its concerns on HIV/AIDS through its "Let's fight AIDS together" initiative and supplies Antiretroviral drugs to Africa, Asia Pacific and CIS. As a part of its corporate social responsibility it supports 'Taal', a pharmacy for HIV/AIDS patients run by HIV/AIDS patients.

Emcure has license agreements with Bristol-Myers Squibb for Atazanavir and Gilead Sciences for Tenofovir as part of their Global Access Programs.

Anticancer portfolio 
Roche has signed a deal with Emcure for manufacturing its blockbuster anticancer drugs Herceptin and Mabthera in India. Under this programme the cancer drugs shall be made available to the developing world at an affordable 'cut-price' version.

Price fixing
Heritage Pharmaceuticals, a division of Emcure has entered into a deferred prosecution agreement with the United States Department of Justice, Antitrust Division ("DOJ") relating to a one-count Information for a conspiracy involving glyburide. In conjunction with the DPA, Heritage will pay a $225,000 fine.

In addition, the Company separately agreed to a settlement with the United States Department of Justice, Civil Division to resolve potential civil liability under the False Claims Act in connection with the antitrust conduct. Under the terms of the settlement, the company has agreed to pay $7.1 million. Heritage has agreed to pay $7.1 million as part of a settlement with DOJ's Civil Division to resolve allegations of selling drugs at the artificially inflated prices, which resulted in claims submitted to or purchases by federal healthcare programs.
After the scandal, Emcure renamed Heritage to Avet Pharma  - opposite of Teva, since many new executives joined after stepping down from Teva.

Controversies and recalls
There are allegations that Emcure (through its sister company Gennova) stole the technology of vaccine production by breaching contract with HDT Bio. Earlier Emcure broke ties with Roche in similar way. In the Drug Price Fixing case, Emcure CEO Satish Mehta was alleged to collude and conspire with Rajiv Malik to jack up prices of essential drugs.

The USFDA had given Warning Letter for data integrity manipulation problems at Emcure plants.

In 2010, Pfizer had to recall three batches of an anti-bacterial product from the US market due to presence of Bacillus anthracis, Penicillium chrysogenum & E. coli in some samples. Teva recalled several batches of two products due to white tablets showing presence of Yersinia pestis in 2011.

Even in the domestic market, Maharashtra FDA issued a circular to recall all the injections (500 mg /10 ml) manufactured by Emcure Pharmaceuticals Ltd, from across the country.

Two injected drugs manufactured by Emcure, with a history of sterility problems were recalled because of microbial contamination. The drugs were both manufactured by Emcure Pharmaceuticals but were distributed in the U.S. by Heritage Pharmaceuticals (now renamed Avet).

References

External links 
Emcure website

Manufacturing companies based in Pune
Pharmaceutical companies of India
Pharmaceutical companies established in 1983
Indian companies established in 1983
Indian brands
1983 establishments in Maharashtra